was a Japanese castle in Hizen Province (today in Minamishimabara, Nagasaki). During the Shimabara Rebellion (1637–1638), rebellious peasants were besieged there.

As a result of the Shimabara Rebellion in 1637, the Shogunate decided to expel the Portuguese from Japan. The Dutch, meanwhile, gained the trust of the authorities after they bombarded Hara Castle, where the insurgents had taken refuge, and thus gained a monopoly on European trade with Japan.

The remains of Hara Castle has been determined as a World Heritage Site in 2018.

Literature

References 

Castles in Nagasaki Prefecture
Hidden Christian Sites in the Nagasaki Region